Prosopagnosia (from Greek prósōpon, meaning "face", and  agnōsía, meaning "non-knowledge"), more commonly known as face blindness, is a cognitive disorder of face perception in which the ability to recognize familiar faces, including one's own face (self-recognition), is impaired, while other aspects of visual processing (e.g., object discrimination) and intellectual functioning (e.g., decision-making) remain intact. The term originally referred to a condition following acute brain damage (acquired prosopagnosia), but a congenital or developmental form of the disorder also exists, with a prevalence of 2.5%. The brain area usually associated with prosopagnosia is the fusiform gyrus, which activates specifically in response to faces. The functionality of the fusiform gyrus allows most people to recognize faces in more detail than they do similarly complex inanimate objects. For those with prosopagnosia, the method for recognizing faces depends on the less sensitive object-recognition system. The right hemisphere fusiform gyrus is more often involved in familiar face recognition than the left. It remains unclear whether the fusiform gyrus is specific for the recognition of human faces or if it is also involved in highly trained visual stimuli.

Acquired prosopagnosia results from occipito-temporal lobe damage and is most often found in adults. It is subdivided into apperceptive and associative prosopagnosia. In congenital prosopagnosia, the individual never adequately develops the ability to recognize faces.

Though there have been several attempts at remediation, no therapies have demonstrated lasting improvements across a group of prosopagnosics. Prosopagnosics often learn to use "piecemeal" or "feature-by-feature" recognition strategies. This may involve secondary clues such as clothing, gait, hair color, skin color, body shape, and voice. Because the face seems to function as an important identifying feature in memory, it can also be difficult for people with this condition to keep track of information about people, and socialize normally with others. Prosopagnosia has also been associated with other disorders that are associated with nearby brain areas: left hemianopsia (loss of vision from left side of space, associated with damage to the right occipital lobe), achromatopsia (a deficit in color perception often associated with unilateral or bilateral lesions in the temporo-occipital junction) and topographical disorientation (a loss of environmental familiarity and difficulties in using landmarks, associated with lesions in the posterior part of the parahippocampal gyrus and anterior part of the lingual gyrus of the right hemisphere).

The opposite of prosopagnosia is the skill of superior face recognition ability.  People with this ability are called "super recognizers".

In one study of students of east-Asian ethnicity, males were found to be significantly poorer at face-recognition.

Types

Apperceptive 
Apperceptive prosopagnosia has typically been used to describe cases of acquired prosopagnosia with some of the earliest processes in the face perception system. The brain areas thought to play a critical role in apperceptive prosopagnosia are right occipital temporal regions.  People with this disorder cannot make any sense of faces and are unable to make same–different judgments when they are presented with pictures of different faces. They are unable to recognize both familiar and unfamiliar faces. In addition, apperceptive sub-types of prosopagnosia struggle recognizing facial emotion. However, they may be able to recognize people based on non-face clues such as their clothing, hairstyle, skin color, or voice. Apperceptive prosopagnosia is believed to be associated with impaired fusiform gyrus. Experiments on the formation of new face detectors in adults on face-like stimuli (learning to distinguish the faces of cats) indicate that such new detectors are formed not in the fusiform, but in the lingual gyrus.

Associative 
Associative prosopagnosia has typically been used to describe cases of acquired prosopagnosia with spared perceptual processes but impaired links between early face perception processes and the semantic information humans hold about people in our memories. Right anterior temporal regions may also play a critical role in associative prosopagnosia. People with this form of the disorder may be able to tell whether photos of people's faces are the same or different and derive the age and sex from a face (suggesting they can make sense of some face information) but may not be able to subsequently identify the person or provide any information about them such as their name, occupation, or when they were last encountered. Associative prosopagnosia is thought to be due to impaired functioning of the parahippocampal gyrus.

Developmental 
Developmental prosopagnosia (DP), also called congenital prosopagnosia (CP), is a face-recognition deficit that is lifelong, manifesting in early childhood, and that cannot be attributed to acquired brain damage. While developmental prosopagnosia begins early in life, many people do not realize that they have DP until later in their adult lives. A number of studies have found functional deficits in DP both on the basis of EEG measures and fMRI. It has been suggested that a genetic factor is responsible for the condition. The term "hereditary prosopagnosia" was introduced if DP affected more than one family member, essentially accenting the possible genetic contribution of this condition. To examine this possible genetic factor, 689 randomly selected students were administered a survey in which seventeen developmental prosopagnosics were quantifiably identified. Family members of fourteen of the DP individuals were interviewed to determine prosopagnosia-like characteristics, and in all fourteen families, at least one other affected family member was found.

In 2005, a study led by Ingo Kennerknecht showed support for the proposed congenital disorder form of prosopagnosia. This study provides epidemiological evidence that congenital prosopagnosia is a frequently occurring cognitive disorder that often runs in families. The analysis of pedigree trees formed within the study also indicates that the segregation pattern of hereditary prosopagnosia (HPA) is fully compatible with autosomal dominant inheritance. This mode of inheritance explains why HPA is so common among certain families (Kennerknecht et al. 2006).

Cause 
Prosopagnosia can be caused by lesions in various parts of the inferior occipital areas (occipital face area), fusiform gyrus (fusiform face area), and the anterior temporal cortex. Positron emission tomography (PET) and fMRI scans have shown that, in individuals without prosopagnosia, these areas are activated specifically in response to face stimuli. The inferior occipital areas are mainly involved in the early stages of face perception and the anterior temporal structures integrate specific information about the face, voice, and name of a familiar person.

Acquired prosopagnosia can develop as the result of several neurologically damaging causes. Vascular causes of prosopagnosia include posterior cerebral artery infarcts (PCAIs) and hemorrhages in the infero-medial part of the temporo-occipital area. These can be either bilateral or unilateral, but if they are unilateral, they are almost always in the right hemisphere. Recent studies have confirmed that right hemisphere damage to the specific temporo-occipital areas mentioned above is sufficient to induce prosopagnosia. MRI scans of patients with prosopagnosia showed lesions isolated to the right hemisphere, while fMRI scans showed that the left hemisphere was functioning normally. Unilateral left temporo-occipital lesions result in object agnosia, but spare face recognition processes, although a few cases have been documented where left unilateral damage resulted in prosopagnosia. It has been suggested that these face recognition impairments caused by left hemisphere damage are due to a semantic defect blocking retrieval processes that are involved in obtaining person-specific semantic information from the visual modality.

Other less common etiologies include carbon monoxide poisoning, temporal lobectomy, encephalitis, neoplasm, right temporal lobe atrophy, injury, Parkinson's disease, and Alzheimer's disease.

Diagnosis 
There are few neuropsychological assessments that can definitively diagnose prosopagnosia. One commonly used test is the famous faces tests, where individuals are asked to recognize the faces of famous persons. However, this test is difficult to standardize. The Benton Facial Recognition Test (BFRT) is another test used by neuropsychologists to assess face recognition skills. Individuals are presented with a target face above six test faces and are asked to identify which test face matches the target face. The images are cropped to eliminate hair and clothes, as many people with prosopagnosia use hair and clothing cues to recognize faces. Both male and female faces are used during the test. For the first six items only one test face matches the target face; during the next seven items, three of the test faces match the target faces and the poses are different. The reliability of the BFRT was questioned when a study conducted by Duchaine and Nakayama showed that the average score for 11 self-reported prosopagnosics was within the normal range.  One reason for this may be the way the test is designed. People with developmental prosopagnosia often use piecemeal strategies, which this test encourages by providing the target face to compare with possible matching faces. As the test increases in difficulty more and more facial features become obscured due to position and lighting, leading normal control subjects to rely on the exact same strategy of looking for individual features to match with the target face.

The test may be useful for identifying patients with apperceptive prosopagnosia, since this is mainly a matching test and they are unable to recognize both familiar and unfamiliar faces. They would be unable to pass the test. It would not be useful in diagnosing patients with associative prosopagnosia since they are able to match faces.

The Cambridge Face Memory Test (CFMT) was developed by Duchaine and Nakayama to better diagnose people with prosopagnosia. This test initially presents individuals with three images each of six different target faces. They are then presented with many three-image series, which contain one image of a target face and two distracters. Duchaine and Nakayama showed that the CFMT is more accurate and efficient than previous tests in diagnosing patients with prosopagnosia. Their study compared the two tests and 75% of patients were diagnosed by the CFMT, while only 25% of patients were diagnosed by the BFRT. However, similar to the BFRT, patients are being asked to essentially match unfamiliar faces, as they are seen only briefly at the start of the test. The test is not currently widely used and will need further testing before it can be considered reliable.

The 20-item Prosopagnosia Index (PI20) is a freely available and validated self-report questionnaire that can be used alongside computer-based face recognition tests to help  identify individuals with prosopagnosia. It has been validated using objective measures of face perception ability including famous face recognition tests and the Cambridge Face Memory Test. Less than 1.5% of the general population score above 65 on the PI20 and less than 65% on the CFMT.

Treatment
There are no widely accepted treatments.

Prognosis 
Management strategies for acquired prosopagnosia, such as a person who has difficulty recognizing people's faces after a stroke, generally have a low rate of success.  Acquired prosopagnosia sometimes spontaneously resolves.

History 
Selective inabilities to recognize faces were documented as early as the 19th century, and included case studies by Hughlings Jackson and Charcot. He described three cases, including a 24-year-old man who sustained a bullet wound to the head and lost his ability to recognize his friends, family, and even his own face. However, he was able to recognize and identify them through other sensory modalities such as auditory, tactile, and even other visual stimuli patterns (such as gait and other physical mannerisms). Bodamer gave his paper the title Die Prosop-Agnosie, derived from Classical Greek πρόσωπον (prósōpon) meaning "face" and αγνωσία (agnōsía) meaning "non-knowledge". In October 1996, Bill Choisser began popularizing the term face blindness for this condition; the earliest-known use of the term is in an 1899 medical paper.

A case of a prosopagnosia is "Dr P." in Oliver Sacks' 1985 book The Man Who Mistook His Wife for a Hat, though this is more properly considered to be one of a more general visual agnosia. Although Dr P. could not recognize his wife from her face, he was able to recognize her by her voice. His recognition of pictures of his family and friends appeared to be based on highly specific features, such as his brother's square jaw and big teeth. Oliver Sacks himself had prosopagnosia, but did not know it for much of his life.

The study of prosopagnosia has been crucial in the development of theories of face perception. Because prosopagnosia is not a unitary disorder (i.e., different people may show different types and levels of impairment), it has been argued that face perception involves a number of stages, each of which can cause qualitative differences in impairment that different persons with prosopagnosia may exhibit.

This sort of evidence has been crucial in supporting the theory that there may be a specific face perception system in the brain. Most researchers agree that the facial perception process is holistic rather than featural, as it is for perception of most objects. A holistic perception of the face does not involve any explicit representation of local features (i.e., eyes, nose, mouth, etc.), but rather considers the face as a whole.

As the prototypical face has a specific spatial layout (eyes are always located above nose, and nose located above mouth), it is beneficial to use a holistic approach to recognize individual/specific faces from a group of similar layouts. This holistic processing of the face is exactly what is damaged in prosopagnosics. They are able to recognize the specific spatial layout and characteristics of facial features, but they are unable to process them as one entire face. This is counterintuitive to many people, as not everyone believes faces are "special" or perceived in a different way from other objects in the rest of the world. Though evidence suggests that other visual objects are processed in a holistic manner (e.g., dogs in dog experts), the size of these effects are smaller and are less consistently demonstrated than with faces. In a study conducted by Diamond and Carey, they showed this to be true by performing tests on dog-show judges. They showed pictures of dogs to the judges and to a control group and they then inverted those same pictures and showed them again. The dog-show judges had greater difficulty in recognizing the dogs once inverted compared to the control group; the inversion effect, the increased difficulty in recognizing a picture once inverted, was shown to be in effect. It was previously believed that the inversion effect was associated only with faces, but this study shows that it may apply to any category of expertise.

It has also been argued that prosopagnosia may be a general impairment in understanding how individual perceptual components make up the structure or gestalt of an object. Psychologist Martha Farah has been particularly associated with this view.

Children
Developmental prosopagnosia can be a difficult thing for a child to both understand and cope with. Many adults with developmental prosopagnosia report that for a long time they had no idea that they had a deficit in face processing, unaware that others could distinguish people solely on facial differences.

Prosopagnosia in children may be overlooked; they may just appear to be very shy or slightly odd due to their inability to recognize faces. They may also have a hard time making friends, as they may not recognize their classmates. They often make friends with children who have very clear, distinguishing features.

Children with prosopagnosia may also have difficulties following the plots of television shows and movies, as they have trouble recognizing the different characters. They tend to gravitate towards cartoons, in which characters have simple but well-defined characteristics, and tend to wear the same clothes, may be strikingly different colours or even different species. Prosopagnosiac children even have a hard time telling family members apart, or recognizing people out of context (e.g., the teacher in a grocery store). Some have difficulty recognising themselves in group photographs.

Additionally, children with prosopagnosia can have a difficult time at school, as many school professionals are not well versed in prosopagnosia, if they are aware of the disorder at all. Recently, a database of children's faces and test for child face perception has been developed, which may offer professionals a way to evaluate if a child has prosopagnosia.

Notable people 
The following is a list of public figures and other notable people with prosopagnosia.

 Alan Alda (born 1936), American actor 
 Duncan Bannatyne (born 1949), Scottish entrepreneur
 Sara Benincasa (born 1980) American comedian and author
 Dave Chalk (born 1963), Canadian entrepreneur
 Chuck Close (1940–2021), American painter
 Paul Foot (born 1973), English comedian
 Stephen Fry (born 1957), English actor
 Robert Gascoyne-Cecil, 3rd Marquess of Salisbury (1830–1903)
 Jane Goodall (born 1934), English primatologist
 John Hickenlooper (born 1952), US Senator and former Governor of Colorado
 Margaret Kerry (born 1929), American actress and reference model for Tinker Bell
 Karl Kruszelnicki (born 1948), Australian science communicator
 Markos Moulitsas (born 1971), American blogger and founder of DailyKos.com
 Brad Pitt (born 1963), American actor and film producer
 Oliver Sacks (1933–2015), British neurologist
 Mary Ann Sieghart (born 1961), English journalist and radio presenter
 Victoria, Crown Princess of Sweden (born 1977)
 Jim Woodring (born 1952), American cartoonist
 Steve Wozniak (born 1950), American computer engineer and co-founder of Apple Inc.

See also

References

Further reading

External links 

 Face Blind!The online book on face blindness by Bill Choisser, San Francisco.

Agnosia
Face perception
Vision
Visual disturbances and blindness
Visual system